The 2008 International Challenge Cup (also called the AEGON Challenge Cup after its title sponsor) was held between March 6 and 9, 2008 in The Hague. Skaters competed in the disciplines of men's singles, ladies' singles, and ice dancing, across the levels of senior, junior, novice, and the pre-novice discipline called "Debs". The junior compulsory dance was the Viennese Waltz.

Senior results

Men

Ladies

Junior results

Men

Ladies

Ice dancing

Novice results

Boys

Girls

Debs results

Boys

Girls

External links
 2008 International Challenge Cup (Archived 2009-05-21)

International Challenge Cup, 2008
Figure skating in the Netherlands